Lol Salaam (stylized as LOL Salaam) is an Indian Telugu-language adventure comedy web series created and directed by Naani. The series has an ensemble cast of Ajju Bharadwaj, Vasu Inturi, Harsha Vardhan, Darahas Maturu, Kivish Kautilya and Rohit Krishna Varma. It premiered on 25 June 2021 on ZEE5.

Synopsis 
Five friends John, Reddy, Naidu and Khan go on a short trip to a nearby waterfalls in the forest, along with their middle-aged Babai (English: Uncle). Soon, their car breaks down near the forest. Then they decide to go by-walk. As they go through the forest, Reddy ends up stepping on a landmine which was rooted in the land by a Naxalite group. The story follows on how the group of friends rescued and save their trapped buddy Reddy.

Cast 

 Ajju Bharadwaj as John
 Vasu Inturi as John's father; a pastor in the church
 Harsha Vardhan as MLA G. P. Ramakrishna
 Darahas Maturu as Naidu
 Kivish Kautilya as Reddy
 Rohit Krishna Varma as Varma
 Pavan Kumar Alluri as Babai
 Aishwarya Bala as Aishwarya
 Padmini Settam as Sahasya
 Srinivas Reddy Ramireddy as Khan
 Gayathri Dolly as Swarna
 Praveena Laxmi as Supraja
Mahendraa as Krishna 
G. Appalaraju Personal Assistant of MLA
Ansari
Bhaskaran
Gopal Bhati
K. Ram Mohan
Suresh Peddapalli
Maniraj Marka
Jagadam Naveen
Sai Chand

Episodes

Soundtrack

Reception 
The series received generally favorable reviews with the actors' performances being praised and positive response from audiences, mainly Telugu Youth.

A critic from Snooper Scope quoted it as "A  thoroughly riotous entertainer exploring a social angle which can be enjoyed except for few loopholes in the latter episodes and spoilers in the form of cuss words. On the whole, Lol Salaam provides wholesome entertainment with refreshing performances that was enjoyable. The creator and director Naani deserve all the bouquets for his brilliant interpretation and presentation of a novel concept admirably on the screen."

Another critic, writing to Binged said that "It is a series made on a wafer-thin storyline. However, the director manages to keep things exciting with the writing and the ‘collective’ timing of the actors." and added that "There is very little in it story-wise. Still, one is engaged in the narrative primarily because of the writing and the timing. The five guys play off each other superbly, and the punches are quick and fast without any drag. The way it’s executed in a trendy (urban realism) way deserves special mention." "

Karthik Keramulu of Film Companion stated "LOL Salaam is a comedy that can be consumed in bits and pieces" and added that LOL Salaam may come across as a slightly better show.

Another critic, writing to LetsOTT said that "LOL Salaam is a starts off as a comedy caper as gang of 6 men land neck-deep in trouble and it switches templates in a rather hurried manner and quoted The comedy generated through the hardships faced by the lead characters is the major highlight."

Sathvik of Xappie stated "LOL Salaam is partly an entertaining series with fine performances from the up-and-coming lead cast. It will make for an okayish one-time-watch."

References

External links 

 

Telugu-language web series
2021 web series debuts
ZEE5 original programming
Indian comedy web series